2-Chloro-N6-cyclopentyladenosine (CCPA) is a specific receptor agonist for the Adenosine A1 receptor. It is similar to N6-cyclopentyladenosine.

References

Nucleosides
Purines
Organochlorides
Adenosine receptor agonists
Cyclopentyl compounds